The following lists events that happened during 1990 in Somalia.

Incumbents
 President: Siad Barre 
 Prime Minister: Mohammad Ali Samatar (until 3 September), Muhammad Hawadle Madar (starting 3 September)

Events

July
 July 6 - President Siad Barre's bodyguards massacre anti-government demonstrators during a soccer match; 65 people are killed, more than 300 seriously injured.

References

 
1990s in Somalia
Years of the 20th century in Somalia
Somalia
Somalia